Immaculate Conception Catholic Church, is currently located at 2900 McCarran Way in Sparks, Nevada, United States. It is part of the Roman Catholic Diocese of Reno.

History 
The former location on Prater Way in Sparks, Nevada was a brick Roman Catholic church that was built in 1932 to replace an earlier church that was built in 1905 but destroyed by a fire in 1930.  It was designed by prolific Nevada architect Frederic J. DeLongchamps (1882-1969) in Mediterranean Revival architecture.

It was used as a Catholic church as late as 2004 when construction on a larger building was completed and the parish moved to current location. When the older building on Prater Way, Sparks, Nevada was photographed in 2014, it was operating under the name "Iglesia Cristiana Monte Sinai".

The older church building on Prater Way was listed on the National Register of Historic Places in 1992.  The building was deemed significant as the oldest surviving Catholic church in Sparks, as one of the first built in Nevada after the state became a diocese under 1931 decree of Pope Pius XI, and architecturally as a relatively rare use of Mediterranean Revival style in Nevada and "one of the many outstanding works" of DeLongchamps.

Its original form is "somewhat obscured" by a 1970 addition of a vestibule and porch on the front, added to provide handicapped access, but the addition was designed to be compatible architecturally.

The newer location had further construction in 2006 to build a Faith Foundation building in the east end of the parking lot. That construction was completed in 2007.

Gallery

References

External links 

 Official Website for Immaculate Conception Catholic Church - Sparks, Nevada
Diocese of Reno

Roman Catholic Diocese of Reno
Roman Catholic churches completed in 1932
National Register of Historic Places in Washoe County, Nevada
Mediterranean Revival architecture
Roman Catholic churches in Nevada
Churches on the National Register of Historic Places in Nevada
Frederic Joseph DeLongchamps buildings
20th-century Roman Catholic church buildings in the United States